Trimenia wykehami, the Wykeham's silver-spotted copper, is a butterfly of the family Lycaenidae. It is found in South Africa, where it is found from Beaufort West to the Roggeveld escarpment in the Western Cape.

The wingspan is 24–32 mm for males and 27–39 mm females. Adults are on wing from November to December. There is one generation per year.

References

Butterflies described in 1969
Trimenia (butterfly)